New Lenox School District 122 provides primary education services to students in grades kindergarten through 8.  The superintendent is Dr. Lori Motsch.  The student body is drawn primarily from the village of New Lenox, Illinois in Will County and surrounding areas.

Schools

Elementary schools
 Tyler Elementary School
  Bentley Elementary School
 Haines Elementary School
 Nelson Prairie Elementary School
 Nelson Ridge Elementary School
 Oster-Oakview Elementary School
 Spencer Crossing Elementary School
 Spencer Pointe Elementary School

Middle schools
 Alex M. Martino Junior High School
 Liberty Junior High School

See also 
 Webster v. New Lenox School District

External links
 Official site

School districts in Will County, Illinois